Po Tong Ha is a village in Tuen Mun District, Hong Kong.

Administration
Po Tong Ha is a recognized village under the New Territories Small House Policy. It is one of the 36 villages represented within the Tuen Mun Rural Committee. For electoral purposes, Po Tong Ha is part of the Po Tin constituency.

See also
 Siu Hang Tsuen (Tuen Mun District), a village located directly south of Po Tong Ha

References

External links
 Delineation of area of existing village Po Tong Ha (Tuen Mun) for election of resident representative (2019 to 2022)

Villages in Tuen Mun District, Hong Kong